Men's Overall World Cup 1982/1983

Final point standings

In Men's Overall World Cup 1982/83 the best five downhills, best five giant slaloms/Super G, best five slaloms and best three combined count. The parallel slalom only counts for the Nationscup (or was a show-event).

References
 fis-ski.com

World Cup
FIS Alpine Ski World Cup overall titles